P. J. Qualter (1943 – 25 July 2019) was an Irish hurler who played for Galway Senior Championship club Turloughmore and at inter-county level with the Galway senior hurling team. He usually lined out as a full-forward.

Honours

Turloughmore
Galway Senior Hurling Championship (6): 1961, 1962, 1963, 1964, 1965, 1966

Galway
National Hurling League (1): 1974-75

References

1943 births
2019 deaths
Turloughmore hurlers
Galway inter-county hurlers
Connacht inter-provincial hurlers
People from County Galway